Abruzzo Citra or Abruzzo Citeriore was a province of the Kingdom of Naples established by Charles of Anjou when he divided Giustizierato of Abruzzo (founded by Frederick II) into two parts: Ultra flumen Aprutium Piscariae (Aprutium beyond the Pescara) and Aprutium citra flumen Piscariae (Aprutium this side of the Pescara).

Abruzzo Citra was located south of the Pescara river and within the area of today's Abruzzo region of Italy, and for the most part within the present Province of Chieti; the seat was the city of Chieti.

Today the term citra is associated with table wines produced in this region of Abruzzo and exported overseas.

See also
Abruzzo Ultra

References

Sources
:it:Abruzzo Citra

Provinces of the Kingdom of Naples
Geographical, historical and cultural regions of Italy
Abruzzo
Province of Chieti